The Story of Film: An Odyssey is a 2011 British documentary film about the history of film, presented on television in 15 one-hour chapters with a total length of over 900 minutes.  It was directed and narrated by Mark Cousins, a film critic from Northern Ireland, based on his 2004 book The Story of Film.

The series was broadcast in September 2011 on More4, the digital television service of UK broadcaster Channel 4.  The Story of Film was also featured in its entirety at the 2011 Toronto International Film Festival, and at 2012 Istanbul International Film Festival. It was exhibited at the Museum of Modern Art in New York City in February 2012.  It was broadcast in the United States on Turner Classic Movies beginning in September 2013.

The Telegraph headlined the series' initial broadcast in September 2011 as the "cinematic event of the year", describing it as "visually ensnaring and intellectually lithe, it’s at once a love letter to cinema, an unmissable masterclass, and a radical rewriting of movie history."  An Irish Times writer called the programme a "landmark" (albeit a "bizarrely underpromoted" one).  The programme won a Peabody Award in 2013 "for its inclusive, uniquely annotated survey of world cinema history."

In February 2012, A.O. Scott of The New York Times described Cousins' film as "a semester-long film studies survey course compressed into 15 brisk, sometimes contentious hours" that "stands as an invigorated compendium of conventional wisdom." Contrasting the project with its "important precursor (and also, perhaps, an implicit interlocutor)", Jean-Luc Godard’s Histoire(s) du cinéma, Scott commended Cousins' film as "the place from which all future revisionism must start".

List of episodes
Each episode section below lists the film clips that are featured in that episode.

Episode 1 - Birth of the Cinema

Introduction
Saving Private Ryan (1998) dir. Steven Spielberg
Three Colors: Blue (1993) dir. Krzysztof Kieślowski
Casablanca (1942) dir. Michael Curtiz
The Record of a Tenement Gentleman (1947) dir. Yasujirō Ozu
Odd Man Out (1947) dir. Carol Reed
Two or Three Things I Know About Her (1967) dir. Jean-Luc Godard
Taxi Driver (1976) dir. Martin Scorsese
The French Connection (1971) dir. William Friedkin

1895-1918: The World Discovers a New Art Form or Birth of the Cinema
Traffic Crossing Leeds Bridge (1888) dir. Louis Le Prince
The Kiss (1896 film) (a.k.a. May Irwin Kiss) (1896) dir. William Heise
Workers Leaving the Lumière Factory (1895) dir. Louis Lumière
Arrival of a Train at La Ciotat (1896) dir. Louis Lumière
Annabelle Serpentine Dance (1894-1896 ?) dir. William Kennedy Dickson or William Heise
Sandow (1894) dir. William Kennedy Dickson
What Happened on Twenty-third Street, New York City (1901) dir. George S. Fleming and Edwin S. Porter
Cendrillon (1899) dir. Georges Méliès
Le voyage dans la lune (1902) dir. Georges Méliès
La lune à un mètre (1898) dir. Georges Méliès
The Kiss in the Tunnel (1899) dir. George Albert Smith
Shoah (1985) dir. Claude Lanzmann
2001: A Space Odyssey (1968) dir. Stanley Kubrick
The Sick Kitten (1903) dir. George Albert Smith
October: Ten Days That Shook the World (1928) dir. Sergei Eisenstein
Once Upon a Time in the West (1968)  dir. Sergio Leone
The Corbett-Fitzsimmons Fight (1897) dir. Enoch J. Rector

1903-1918: The Thrill Becomes Story or The Hollywood Dream
Life of an American Fireman (1903) dir. Edwin S. Porter
Sherlock Jr. (1924) dir. Buster Keaton
The Horse that Bolted (1907) dir. Charles Pathé
The Assassination of the Duke of Guise (a.k.a. The Assassination of the Duc de Guise) (1908) dir. Charles le Bargy and André Calmettes
Vivre sa vie (1962) dir. Jean-Luc Godard
Those Awful Hats (1909) dir. D. W. Griffith
The Mended Lute (1909) dir. D. W. Griffith
The Abyss (1910) dir. Urban Gad
Stage Struck (1925) dir. Allan Dwan
The Mysterious X (1914) dir. Benjamin Christensen
Häxan (1922)  dir. Benjamin Christensen
Ingeborg Holm (1913) dir. Victor Sjöström
The Phantom Carriage (1921) dir. Victor Sjöström
Shanghai Express (1932) dir. Josef von Sternberg
The Story of the Kelly Gang (1906) dir. Charles Tait
The Squaw Man (1914) dir. Oscar Apfel and Cecil B. DeMille
The Empire Strikes Back (1980) dir. Irvin Kershner
Falling Leaves (1912) dir. Alice Guy-Blaché
Suspense (1913) dir. Phillips Smalley and Lois Weber
The Wind (1928) dir. Victor Sjöström
Rescued from an Eagle's Nest (1908) dir. J. Searle Dawley
The House with Closed Shutters (1910) dir. D. W. Griffith
Way Down East (1920) dir. D. W. Griffith
Orphans of the Storm (1921) dir. D. W. Griffith
The Birth of a Nation (1915) dir. D. W. Griffith
Rebirth of a Nation (2007) dir. DJ Spooky
Cabiria (1914) dir. Giovanni Pastrone
Intolerance (1916) dir. D. W. Griffith
Souls on the Road (a.k.a. Rojo No Reikan) (1921)  dir. Minoru Murata

Episode 2 - The Hollywood Dream

1918-1928: The Triumph of American Film...
Citizen Kane (1941)  dir. Orson Welles
The Thief of Bagdad (1924) dir. Raoul Walsh
Desire (1936) dir. Frank Borzage
Gone with the Wind (1939) dir. Victor Fleming
Gold Diggers of 1933 (1933) dir. Mervyn LeRoy
Singin' in the Rain (1952) dir. Gene Kelly and Stanley Donen
The Maltese Falcon (1941) dir. John Huston
The Scarlet Empress (1934) dir. Josef von Sternberg
The Cameraman (1928) dir. Edward Sedgwick and Buster Keaton
One Week (1920) dir. Edward F. Cline and Buster Keaton
Sherlock Jr. (1924) (introduced in Episode 1) dir. Buster Keaton
Three Ages (1923) dir. Buster Keaton and Edward F. Cline
Buster Keaton Rides Again (1965) dir. John Spotton
The General (1926) dir. Clyde Bruckman and Buster Keaton
Divine Intervention (2002) dir. Elia Suleiman
Limelight (1952) dir. Charlie Chaplin
City Lights (1931) dir. Charlie Chaplin
The Kid (1921) dir. Charlie Chaplin
Bad Timing (1980) dir. Nicolas Roeg
The Great Dictator (1940) dir. Charlie Chaplin
Monsieur Hulot's Holiday (1953) dir. Jacques Tati
Toto in Color (1953) dir. Steno
Awaara (1951) dir. Raj Kapoor
Sunset Boulevard (1950) dir. Billy Wilder
Some Like It Hot (1959)  dir. Billy Wilder
Luke's Movie Muddle (1916) dir. Hal Roach
Haunted Spooks (1920) dir. Alfred J. Goulding and Hal Roach
Never Weaken (1921) dir. Fred C. Newmeyer and Sam Taylor
Safety Last! (1923) dir. Fred C. Newmeyer and Sam Taylor
I Flunked, But... (1930) dir. Yasujirō Ozu

...And the First of its Rebels
Nanook of the North (1922) dir. Robert Flaherty
The House Is Black (1963) dir. Forough Farrokhzad
Sans Soleil (1983) dir. Chris Marker
The Not Dead (2007) dir. Brian Hill
The Perfect Human (1967) (shown as part of The Five Obstructions) dir. Jørgen Leth
The Five Obstructions (2003) dir. Lars von Trier and Jørgen Leth
Blind Husbands (1919)  dir. Erich von Stroheim
The Lost Squadron (1932) dir. George Archainbaud and Paul Sloane
Greed (1924) dir. Erich von Stroheim
Stroheim in Vienna (1948)
Queen Kelly (1929) (shown as part of Sunset Boulevard)  dir. Erich von Stroheim
The Crowd (1928) dir. King Vidor
The Apartment (1960)  dir. Billy Wilder
The Trial (1962) dir. Orson Welles
Aelita: Queen of Mars (1924) dir. Yakov Protazanov
Posle Smerti (1915) dir. Yevgeni Bauer
The Passion of Joan of Arc (1928) dir. Carl Theodor Dreyer
Ordet (1955) dir. Carl Theodor Dreyer
The President (1919) dir. Carl Theodor Dreyer
Vampyr (1932) dir. Carl Theodor Dreyer
Gertrud (1964) dir. Carl Theodor Dreyer
Dogville (2003) dir. Lars von Trier
Vivre sa vie (1962) (introduced in Episode 1) dir. Jean-Luc Godard

Episode 3 - The Golden Age of World Cinema

1918-1932: The Great Rebel Filmmakers Around the World
The Thief of Bagdad (1924) (introduced in Episode 2) dir. Raoul Walsh
The Passion of Joan of Arc (1928) (introduced in Episode 2) dir. Carl Theodor Dreyer
Robert and Bertram (1915) dir. Max Mack
The Oyster Princess (1919) dir. Ernst Lubitsch
The Mountain Cat (1921) dir. Ernst Lubitsch
The Marriage Circle (1924) dir. Ernst Lubitsch
La Roue (1923) dir. Abel Gance
Napoléon (1927) dir. Abel Gance
The Cabinet of Dr. Caligari (1920) dir. Robert Wiene
The Tell-Tale Heart (1928) dir. Charles Klein
The Lodger (1927) dir. Alfred Hitchcock
A Page of Madness (1926) dir. Teinosuke Kinugasa
Metropolis (1927) dir. Fritz Lang
The Crowd (1928) (introduced in Episode 2) dir. King Vidor
Sunrise: A Song of Two Humans (1927) dir. F. W. Murnau
Opus 1 (1921) dir. Walter Ruttmann
Entr'acte (1924) dir. René Clair
Rien que les heures (1926) dir. Alberto Cavalcanti
Spellbound (1945)  dir. Alfred Hitchcock
Un Chien Andalou (1929) dir. Luis Buñuel
Blue Velvet (1986) dir. David Lynch
L'Age d'Or (1930) dir. Luis Buñuel
Kino-Pravda n. 19 (1924) dir. Dziga Vertov
Glumov's Diary (1923) dir. Sergei Eisenstein
Battleship Potemkin (1925) dir. Sergei Eisenstein
The Untouchables (1987) dir. Brian De Palma
Arsenal (1929) dir. Alexander Dovzhenko
Earth (1930) dir. Alexander Dovzhenko
I Was Born, But... (1932) dir. Yasujirō Ozu
Tokyo Story (1953) dir. Yasujirō Ozu
Jeanne Dielman, 23 quai du Commerce, 1080 Bruxelles (1975) dir. Chantal Akerman
The Record of a Tenement Gentleman (1947) (introduced in Episode 1) dir. Yasujirō Ozu
Osaka Elegy (1936) dir. Kenji Mizoguchi
Citizen Kane (1941) (introduced in Episode 2) dir. Orson Welles
Chikamatsu Monogatari (1954) dir. Kenji Mizoguchi
Mildred Pierce (1945) dir. Michael Curtiz
Romance of the West Chamber (1927) dir. Hou Yao and Minwei Li
Scenes of City Life (1935) dir. Yuan Muzhi
The Goddess (1934) dir. Wu Yonggang
Center Stage (1991) dir. Stanley Kwan
New Women (1935) dir. Cai Chusheng

Episode 4 - The Arrival of Sound

The 1930s: The Great American Movie Genres...
Confessions of a Co-Ed (1931) dir. Dudley Murphy
Love Me Tonight (1932) dir. Rouben Mamoulian
The Golem: How He Came into the World (1920) dir. Carl Boese and Paul Wegener
Frankenstein (1931) dir. James Whale
Eyes Without a Face (1960) dir. Georges Franju
Audition (1999) dir. Takashi Miike
The Public Enemy (1931) dir. William A. Wellman
Scarface (1932) dir. Howard Hawks and Richard Rosson
Scarface (1983) dir. Brian De Palma
Seven Samurai (1954) dir. Akira Kurosawa
Once Upon a Time in America (1984) dir. Sergio Leone
The Iron Horse (1924) dir. John Ford
My Darling Clementine (1946) dir. John Ford
Twentieth Century (1934) dir. Howard Hawks
Bringing Up Baby (1938) dir. Howard Hawks
The Men Who Made the Movies: Howard Hawks (1973) dir. Richard Schickel
Gold Diggers of 1933 (1933) (introduced in Episode 1) dir. Mervyn LeRoy
Gertie the Dinosaur (1914) dir. Winsor McCay
The Adventures of Prince Achmed (1926) dir. Lotte Reiniger
Plane Crazy (1928) dir. Walt Disney and Ub Iwerks
Snow White and the Seven Dwarfs (1937) dir. David Hand, William Cottrell, Wilfred Jackson, Larry Morey, Perce Pearce, and Ben Sharpsteen
One Hundred and One Dalmatians (1961) dir. Clyde Geronimi, Hamilton Luske, and Wolfgang Reitherman

...And the Brilliance of European Film
The Blood of a Poet (1931) dir. Jean Cocteau
Inception (2010) dir. Christopher Nolan
Zéro de conduite (1933) dir. Jean Vigo
If.... (1968) dir. Lindsay Anderson
L'Atalante (1934) dir. Jean Vigo
Le Quai des brumes (1938) dir. Marcel Carné
Les Enfants du Paradis (1945)  dir. Marcel Carné
La Règle du jeu (1939) (a.k.a. The Rules of the Game) dir. Jean Renoir
La Grande Illusion (1937) dir. Jean Renoir
Limite (1931) dir. Mário Peixoto
The Adventures of a Good Citizen (1937) dir. Stefan Themerson
Two Men and a Wardrobe (1958) dir. Roman Polanski
Das Blaue Licht (1932) dir. Leni Riefenstahl
Triumph of the Will (1935) dir. Leni Riefenstahl
Behind the Scenes of the Filming of the Olympic Games (1937) dir. Leni Riefenstahl
Olympia Part Two: Festival of Beauty (1938)  dir. Leni Riefenstahl
Tiefland (1954) dir. Leni Riefenstahl
The Wonderful, Horrible Life of Leni Riefenstahl (1993) dir. Ray Müller
Vertigo (1958)  dir. Alfred Hitchcock
Saboteur (1942) dir. Alfred Hitchcock
Sabotage (1936) dir. Alfred Hitchcock
The 39 Steps (1935) dir. Alfred Hitchcock
Marnie (1964) dir. Alfred Hitchcock
Ninotchka (1939) dir. Ernst Lubitsch
The Wizard of Oz (1939) dir. Victor Fleming
Gone with the Wind (1939) (introduced in Episode 2) dir. Victor Fleming

Episode 5 - Post-War Cinema

1939-1952: The Devastation of War...And a New Movie Language
Rome, Open City (1945) dir. Roberto Rossellini
Stagecoach (1939) dir. John Ford
Directed by John Ford (1971) dir. Peter Bogdanovich
Osaka Elegy (1936) (introduced in Episode 3) dir. Kenji Mizoguchi
Flesh and the Devil (1926) dir. Clarence Brown
Follow the Boys (1944) dir. A. Edward Sutherland
Citizen Kane (1941)  (introduced in Episode 2) dir. Orson Welles
Me and Orson Welles (2008) dir. Richard Linklater
Chimes at Midnight (1965)  dir. Orson Welles
Cabiria (1914) (introduced in Episode 1) dir. Giovanni Pastrone
Intolerance (1916) (introduced in Episode 1)  dir. D. W. Griffith
The General (1926) (introduced in Episode 2) dir. Clyde Bruckman and Buster Keaton
The Maltese Falcon (1941) (introduced in Episode 2) dir. John Huston
The Best Years of Our Lives (1946) dir. William Wyler
Code Unknown (2000) dir. Michael Haneke
Sátántangó (1994) dir. Béla Tarr
How to Marry a Millionaire (1953) dir. Jean Negulesco
Un Homme et une Femme (1966) dir. Claude Lelouch
Heat (1995) dir. Michael Mann
Raging Bull (1980) dir. Martin Scorsese
Bicycle Thieves (1948) dir. Vittorio De Sica
Pin Up Girl (1944) dir. H. Bruce Humberstone
Double Indemnity (1944) dir. Billy Wilder
Portrait of a 66% Perfect Man: Billy Wilder (1982) dir. Annie Tresgot
The Testament of Dr. Mabuse (1933) dir. Fritz Lang
The Big Sleep (1946) dir. Howard Hawks
Rio Bravo (1959) dir. Howard Hawks
The Empire Strikes Back (1980) (introduced in Episode 1) dir. Irvin Kershner
Out of the Past (1947) dir. Jacques Tourneur
The Hitch-Hiker (1953) dir. Ida Lupino
Little Caesar (1931) dir. Mervyn LeRoy
Le Quai des brumes (1938) (introduced in Episode 4) dir. Marcel Carné
La Chienne (1931) dir. Jean Renoir
Scarlet Street (1945) dir. Fritz Lang
American Cinema: Film Noir (1995) dir. Alain Klarer
Gun Crazy (1950) dir. Joseph H. Lewis
Bonnie and Clyde (1967) dir. Arthur Penn
L.A. Confidential (1997) dir. Curtis Hanson
Blade Runner (1982) dir. Ridley Scott
The Dark Knight (2008) dir. Christopher Nolan
Siva (1989) dir. Ram Gopal Varma
Titanic (1997) dir. James Cameron
71st Academy Awards (1999) dir. Louis J. Horvitz
An American in Paris (1951) dir. Vincente Minnelli
The Red Shoes (1948) dir. Michael Powell and Emeric Pressburger
Singin' in the Rain (1952) (introduced in Episode 2) dir. Gene Kelly and Stanley Donen
Flying Down to Rio (1933) dir. Thornton Freeland
Gold Diggers of 1933 (1933) (introduced in Episode 2) dir. Mervyn LeRoy
Indiscreet (1958) dir. Stanley Donen
Two for the Road (1967)  dir. Stanley Donen
A Matter of Life and Death (1946) dir. Michael Powell and Emeric Pressburger
Post Haste (1933) dir. Humphrey Jennings
Listen to Britain (1942) dir. Humphrey Jennings and Stewart McAllister
The Third Man (1949) dir. Carol Reed
The True Glory (1945) dir. Carol Reed and Garson Kanin
Taxi Driver (1976) (introduced in Episode 1) dir. Martin Scorsese

Episode 6 - Sex & Melodrama

1953-1957: The Swollen Story: World Cinema Bursting at the Seams
Rebel Without a Cause (1955) dir. Nicholas Ray
Cairo Station (1958) dir. Youssef Chahine
Paper Flowers (1959) dir. Guru Dutt
Raja Harishchandra (1913) dir. Dadasaheb Phalke
Sant Tukaram (1936) dir. Vishnupant Govind Damle and Sheikh Fattelal
Pather Panchali (1955) dir. Satyajit Ray
Devi (1960) dir. Satyajit Ray
Mother India (1957) dir. Mehboob Khan
Two Stage Sisters (1964) dir. Xie Jin
Ikiru (1952) dir. Akira Kurosawa
Stray Dog (1949)  dir. Akira Kurosawa
Seven Samurai (1954) (introduced in Episode 4) dir. Akira Kurosawa
Throne of Blood (1957)  dir. Akira Kurosawa
The Godfather (1972) dir. Francis Ford Coppola
The Magnificent Seven (1960) dir. John Sturges
Limite (1931) (introduced in Episode 4) dir. Mário Peixoto
Rio 40 Graus (a.k.a. Rio 100 Degrees F.) (1955) dir. Nelson Pereira dos Santos
The Life of General Villa (1914) dir. Christy CabanneDoña Bárbara (1943) dir. Fernando de Fuentes and Miguel M. DelgadoThe Wild Bunch (1969) dir. Sam PeckinpahLa perla (1947) dir. Emilio FernándezLos Olvidados (1950) dir. Luis BuñuelAll That Heaven Allows (1955) dir. Douglas SirkI'm a Stranger Here Myself (1975) dir. David HelpernJohnny Guitar (1954) dir. Nicholas RayFireworks (1947) dir. Kenneth AngerScorpio Rising (1964) dir. Kenneth AngerMarty (television show) (1953) dir. Delbert MannMarty (1955) dir. Delbert MannOn the Waterfront (1954) dir. Elia KazanRed River (1948) dir. Howard Hawks and Arthur RossonTouch of Evil (1958) dir. Orson WellesThe Searchers (1956) dir. John FordVertigo (1958) (introduced in Episode 4) dir. Alfred HitchcockRio Bravo (1959) (introduced in Episode 5) dir. Howard HawksGreat Expectations (1946) dir. David LeanLawrence of Arabia (1962) dir. David LeanO Dreamland (1953) dir. Lindsay AndersonBattleship Potemkin (1925) (introduced in Episode 3) dir. Sergei Eisenstein...And God Created Woman (1956)  dir. Roger Vadim

Episode 7 - European New Wave

1957-1964: The Shock of the New - Modern Filmmaking in Western Europe.Workers Leaving the Lumière Factory (1895) (introduced in Episode 1) dir. Louis LumièreSummer with Monika (1953) dir. Ingmar BergmanThe Seventh Seal (1957) dir. Ingmar BergmanWinter Light (1963) dir. Ingmar BergmanPersona (1966) dir. Ingmar BergmanPickpocket (1959) dir. Robert BressonAu hasard Balthazar (1966) dir. Robert BressonTaxi Driver (1976) (introduced in Episode 1) dir. Martin ScorseseRatcatcher (1999) dir. Lynne RamsayMonsieur Hulot's Holiday (1953) (introduced in Episode 2) dir. Jacques TatiMon Oncle (1956) dir. Jacques TatiFellini's Casanova (1976) dir. Federico FelliniNights of Cabiria (1957)  dir. Federico Fellini8½ (1963)  dir. Federico FelliniStardust Memories (1980) dir. Woody AllenCléo from 5 to 7 (1962) dir. Agnès VardaLast Year at Marienbad (1961) dir. Alain ResnaisThe 400 Blows (1959) dir. François TruffautÀ bout de souffle (1959) dir. Jean-Luc GodardLife of an American Fireman (1903) (introduced in Episode 1) dir. Edwin S. PorterArsenal (1929)  (introduced in Episode 3) dir. Alexander DovzhenkoUne femme mariée (1964) dir. Jean-Luc GodardAmerican Gigolo (1980) dir. Paul SchraderAccattone (1961) dir. Pier Paolo PasoliniThe Gospel According to St. Matthew (1964) dir. Pier Paolo PasoliniThe Passion of Joan of Arc (1928) (introduced in Episode 2) dir. Carl Theodor DreyerA Fistful of Dollars (1964) dir. Sergio LeoneOnce Upon a Time in the West (1968) (introduced in Episode 1) dir. Sergio LeoneJohnny Guitar (1954)  (introduced in Episode 6) dir. Nicholas RaySenso (1954) dir. Luchino ViscontiRocco and His Brothers (1960) dir. Luchino ViscontiL'eclisse (1962) dir. Michelangelo AntonioniThe Passenger (1975) dir. Michelangelo AntonioniThe Travelling Players (1975) dir. Theodoros AngelopoulosThe Wheelchair (1960) dir. Marco FerreriWhat Have I Done to Deserve This? (1984) dir. Pedro AlmodóvarViridiana (1961) dir. Luis BuñuelI Am Curious (Yellow) (1967) dir. Vilgot SjömanLa Maman et la Putain (1973) dir. Jean Eustache

Episode 8 - New Directors, New Form

1965-1969: New Waves - Sweep Around the World.Ashes and Diamonds (1958) dir. Andrzej WajdaTwo Men and a Wardrobe (1958) (introduced in Episode 4) dir. Roman PolanskiHamlet (1948) dir. Laurence OlivierKnife in the Water (1962) dir. Roman PolanskiThe Fearless Vampire Killers (1967) dir. Roman PolanskiThe Hand (1965) dir. Jiří TrnkaThe Fireman's Ball (1967) dir. Miloš FormanDaisies (1966) dir. Věra ChytilováThe Red and the White (1968) dir. Miklós JancsóUne journée d'Andrei Arsenevitch (2000) dir. Chris MarkerAndrei Rublev (1966) dir. Andrei TarkovskyThe Mirror (1975) dir. Andrei TarkovskyStalker (1979) dir. Andrei TarkovskyNostalghia (1983) dir. Andrei TarkovskyShadows of our Forgotten Ancestors (1965) dir. Sergei ParajanovAndrei Tarkovsky & Sergei Parajanov – Islands (1988) dir. Levon GrigoryanBoy (1969) dir. Nagisa OshimaIn the Realm of the Senses (1976) dir. Nagisa OshimaLove and Crime (1969) dir. Teruo IshiiThe Insect Woman (1963) dir. Shōhei ImamuraCitizen Kane (1941) (introduced in Episode 2) dir. Orson WellesNippon Sengoshi - Madamu Onboro No Seikatsu (1970) dir. Shōhei ImamuraAjantrik (1958) dir. Ritwik GhatakThe Cloud-Capped Star (1960) dir. Ritwik GhatakJukti Takko Aar Gappo (1975) dir. Ritwik GhatakUski Roti (1970) dir. Mani KaulBlack God, White Devil (1964) dir. Glauber RochaI Am Cuba (1964) dir. Mikhail KalatozovThe House Is Black (1963) (introduced in Episode 2) dir. Forugh FarrokhzadBlack Girl (1966) dir. Ousmane SembèneSaturday Night and Sunday Morning (1960) dir. Karel ReiszKes (1969) dir. Ken LoachA Hard Day's Night (1964) dir. Richard LesterPrimary (1960) dir. Robert DrewShadows (1959) dir. John CassavetesPsycho (1960) dir. Alfred Hitchcock66 Scenes from America (1982) dir. Jørgen LethBlow Job (1963) dir. Andy WarholWho's Afraid of Virginia Woolf? (1966) dir. Mike NicholsMedium Cool (1969) dir. Haskell WexlerEasy Rider (1969) dir. Dennis HopperMaking "The Shining" (1980) dir. Vivian Kubrick2001: A Space Odyssey (1968) (introduced in Episode 1) dir. Stanley KubrickDer Sieger (1921) dir. Walter Ruttmann

Episode 9 - American Cinema of the 70s

1967-1979: New American Cinema.Duck Soup (1933) dir. Leo McCareyArtists and Models (1955) dir. Frank TashlinCatch-22 (1970) dir. Mike NicholsMash (1970) dir. Robert AltmanThe Graduate (1967) dir. Mike NicholsThe Fireman's Ball (1967) (introduced in Episode 8) dir. Miloš FormanOne Flew over the Cuckoo's Nest (1975) dir. Miloš FormanThe Last Movie (1971) dir. Dennis HopperMcCabe & Mrs. Miller (1971) dir. Robert AltmanThe Conversation (1974) dir. Francis Ford CoppolaMean Streets (1973) dir. Martin ScorseseTaxi Driver (1976) (introduced in Episode 1) dir. Martin ScorseseChikamatsu Monogatari (1954) (introduced in Episode 3) dir. Kenji MizoguchiRaging Bull (1980) (introduced in Episode 5) dir. Martin ScorseseItalianamerican (1974) dir. Martin ScorseseAmerican Gigolo (1980) (introduced in Episode 7) dir. Paul SchraderLight Sleeper (1992) dir. Paul SchraderPickpocket (1959) (introduced in Episode 7) dir. Robert BressonThe Walker (2007) dir. Paul SchraderThe Birth of a Nation (1915) (introduced in Episode 1) dir. D. W. GriffithKiller of Sheep (1978) dir. Charles BurnettThe Shop Around the Corner (1940) dir. Ernst LubitschAnnie Hall (1977) dir. Woody AllenCity Lights (1931) (introduced in Episode 2) dir. Charlie ChaplinManhattan (1979) dir. Woody AllenThe Last Picture Show (1971) dir. Peter BogdanovichThe Wild Bunch (1969) dir. Sam PeckinpahPat Garrett and Billy the Kid (1973) dir. Sam PeckinpahBadlands (1973) dir. Terrence MalickDays of Heaven (1978) dir. Terrence MalickMirror (1975) (introduced in Episode 8) dir. Andrei TarkovskyCabaret (1972) dir. Bob FosseThe Godfather (1972) (introduced in Episode 6) dir. Francis Ford CoppolaChinatown (1974) dir. Roman PolanskiThe Maltese Falcon (1941) (introduced in Episode 2)  dir. John HustonJules et Jim (1962) dir. François Truffaut

Episode 10 - Movies to Change the World

1969-1979: Radical Directors in the 70s - Make State of the Nation Movies.Fox and His Friends (1975) (a.k.a. Faustrecht der Freiheit) dir. Rainer Werner FassbinderAll That Heaven Allows (1955) (introduced in Episode 6) dir. Douglas SirkAli: Fear Eats the Soul (1974) (a.k.a. Angst essen Seele auf) dir. Rainer Werner FassbinderThe Bitter Tears of Petra von Kant (1972) (a.k.a. Die Bitteren Tränen der Petra von Kant) dir. Rainer Werner FassbinderAll About Eve (1950) dir. Joseph L. MankiewiczAlice in the Cities (1974) (a.k.a. Alice in den Städten) dir. Wim WendersAn Affair to Remember (1957) dir. Leo McCareyGods of the Plague (1970) (a.k.a. Götter der Pest) dir. Rainer Werner FassbinderThe Second Awakening of Christa Klages (1978) (a.k.a. Das zweite Erwachen der Christa Klages) dir. Margarethe von TrottaBurden of Dreams (1982) dir. Les BlankArabian Nights (1974) (a.k.a. Il fiore delle mille e una notte) dir. Pier Paolo PasoliniThe Spider's Stratagem (1970) (a.k.a. Strategia del ragno) dir. Bernardo BertolucciThe Conformist (1970) (a.k.a. Il conformista) dir. Bernardo BertolucciTaxi Driver (1976) (introduced in Episode 1) dir. Martin ScorseseWomen in Love (1969) dir. Ken RussellPerformance (1970) dir. Donald Cammell & Nicolas RoegMean Streets (1973) (introduced in Episode 9) dir. Martin ScorsesePersona (1966) (introduced in Episode 7) dir. Ingmar BergmanWalkabout (1971) dir. Nicolas RoegPicnic at Hanging Rock (1975) dir. Peter WeirMy Brilliant Career (1979) dir. Gillian ArmstrongMinamata: The Victims and Their World (1971) dir. Noriaki TsuchimotoThe Emperor's Naked Army Marches On (1987) dir. Kazuo HaraBlack Girl (1966) (a.k.a. La noire de...) (introduced in Episode 8) dir. Ousmane SembèneTarzan's Secret Treasure (1941) dir. Richard ThorpeLa nouba des femmes du Mont Chenoua (1971) dir. Assia DjebarXala (1975) dir. Ousmane SembèneSinemaabi: A Dialogue with Djibril Diop Mambéty (1997) dir. Beti Ellerson PoulencBadou Boy (1970) dir. Djibril Diop MambétyHyènes (1992) (a.k.a. Hyenas/Ramatou) dir. Djibril Diop MambétyKaddu Beykat (1975) (a.k.a. Lettre paysanne) dir. Safi FayeHarvest: 3,000 Years (1976) (a.k.a. Mirt sost shi amit) dir. Haile Gerima	Umut (1970) (a.k.a. Hope) dir. Yilmaz Güney & Serif GörenYol (1982) dir. Yilmaz Güney & Serif GörenThe Battle of Chile (1975/1977/1979) (a.k.a. La batalla de Chile) dir. Patricio GuzmánThe Holy Mountain (1973) (a.k.a. La montaña sagrada) dir. Alejandro Jodorowsky

Episode 11 - The Arrival of Multiplexes and Asian Mainstream

1970s and Onwards: Innovation in Popular Culture - Around the World.The Kingdom and the Beauty (1959) dir. Li Han-hsiangA Touch of Zen (1971) dir. King HuEnter the Dragon (1973) dir. Robert ClouseA Better Tomorrow (1986) dir. John WooIron Monkey (1993) dir. Yuen Woo-pingThe Matrix (1999) dir.	Lilly Wachowski & Lana WachowskiOnce Upon a Time in China (1991) dir. Tsui HarkNew Dragon Gate Inn (1992) dir. Raymond LeeMughal-e-Azam (1960) dir. K. AsifDevi (1960) (introduced in Episode 6) dir. Satyajit RayMausam (1975) dir. GulzarZanjeer (1973) dir. Prakash MehraSholay (1975) dir. Ramesh SippyThe Message: The Story of Islam (1976) (a.k.a. Mohammad, Messenger of God) dir. Moustapha AkkadThe Making of an Epic: Mohammad, Messenger of God (1976) dir. Geoffrey Helman & Christopher PenfoldThe Sparrow (1972) dir. Youssef ChahineThe Exorcist (1973) dir. William FriedkinA Guy Named Joe (1943) dir. Victor FlemingJaws (1975) dir. Steven SpielbergThe Making of Steven Spielberg's Jaws (1995) dir. Laurent BouzereauVertigo (1958) (introduced in Episode 4) dir. Alfred HitchcockClose Encounters of the Third Kind (1977) dir.	Steven SpielbergJurassic Park (1993) dir. Steven SpielbergStar Wars (1977) (introduced in Episode 1) dir. George LucasThe Hidden Fortress (1958) dir. Akira KurosawaTriumph of the Will (1935) (a.k.a. Triumph des Willens) (introduced in Episode 4) dir. Leni Riefenstahl

Episode 12 - Fight the Power: Protest in Film

The 1980s: Moviemaking and Protest - Around the World.The Horse Thief (1988) dir. Tian ZhuangzhuangYellow Earth (1985) dir. Chen KaigeRaise the Red Lantern (1991) dir. Zhang YimouHouse of Flying Daggers (2004) dir. Zhang YimouRepentance (1984) dir. Tengiz AbuladzeArsenal (1929) (introduced in Episode 3) dir. Alexander Dovzhenko Come and See (1985) dir. Elem KlimovThe Long Farewell (1971) dir. Kira MuratovaA Short Film About Killing (1988) dir. Krzysztof KieślowskiPsycho (1960) (introduced in Episode 8) dir. Alfred HitchcockWend Kuuni (1983) dir. Gaston KaboréYeelen (1987) dir. Souleymane CisséVideo Killed the Radio Star (1979) (music video) dir. Russell MulcahyFlashdance (1983) dir. Adrian LyneTop Gun (1986) dir. Tony ScottBlue Velvet (1986) (introduced in Episode 3) dir. David LynchThe Elephant Man (1980) dir. David LynchDo the Right Thing (1989) dir. Spike LeeThe Third Man (1949) dir. Carol Reed (introduced in Episode 5)Return of the Secaucus 7 (1980) dir. John SaylesSubway (1985) dir. Luc BessonLes Amants du Pont-Neuf (1991) dir. Leos CaraxAn American in Paris (1951) dir. Vincente Minnelli (introduced in Episode 5)Labyrinth of Passion (1982) dir. Pedro AlmodóvarA Hard Day's Night (1964) (introduced in Episode 8) dir. Richard LesterThe Quince Tree Sun (1992) dir. Víctor EriceMy Beautiful Laundrette (1985) dir. Stephen FrearsMy Childhood (1972) dir. Bill DouglasGregory's Girl (1981) dir. Bill ForsythDistant Voices, Still Lives (1988) dir. Terence DaviesIntolerance (1916) dir. D. W. Griffith (introduced in Episode 1)Young at Heart (1954) dir. Gordon DouglasA Zed & Two Noughts (1986) dir. Peter GreenawayThe Last of England (1988) dir. Derek JarmanVideodrome (1983) dir. David CronenbergCrash (1996) dir. David CronenbergNeighbours (1952) dir. Norman McLarenJesus of Montreal (1989) dir. Denys Arcand

Episode 13 - New Boundaries: World Cinema in Africa, Asia & Latin America

1990-1998: The Last Days of Celluloid - Before the Coming of Digital.The Apple (1998) dir. Samira MakhmalbafA Moment of Innocence (1996) dir. Mohsen MakhmalbafWhere Is the Friend's Home? (1987) dir. Abbas KiarostamiAnd Life Goes On (1991) dir. Abbas KiarostamiThrough the Olive Trees (1994) dir. Abbas KiarostamiDays of Being Wild (1990) dir.	Wong Kar-waiIn the Mood for Love (2000) dir. Wong Kar-waiIrma Vep (1996) dir. Olivier AssayasA City of Sadness (1989) dir. Hou Hsiao-hsienTokyo Story (1953) (introduced in Episode 3) dir. Yasujirō OzuVive L'Amour (1994) dir. Tsai Ming-liangTetsuo: The Iron Man (1989) dir. Shinya TsukamotoVideodrome (1983) (introduced in Episode 12) dir. David CronenbergTetsuo II: Body Hammer (1992) dir. Shinya TsukamotoLa Roue (1923) (introduced in Episode 3) dir. Abel GanceRingu (1998) dir. Hideo NakataThe Exorcist (1973) (introduced in Episode 11) dir. William FriedkinUgetsu Monogatari (1953) dir. Kenji MizoguchiAudition (1999) (introduced in Episode 4) dir. Takashi MiikeBreaking the Waves (1996) dir. Lars von TrierHomicide: Life on the Street (1993-1999) dir. Tom FontanaDogville (2003) dir. Lars von Trier (introduced in Episode 2)La Haine (1995) dir. Mathieu KassovitzDo the Right Thing (1989) (introduced in Episode 12) dir. Spike LeeHumanité (1999) dir. Bruno DumontRosetta (1999) dir. Jean-Pierre Dardenne and Luc DardenneTouki Bouki (1973) dir. Djibril Diop MambétyBeau travail (1999) dir. Claire DenisLate Spring (1949) dir. Yasujirō OzuCrows (1994) dir. Dorota KędzierzawskaWednesday (1997) dir. Victor Kossakovsky24 Realities a Second (2004) dir. Nina Kusturica and Eva TestorCode Unknown (2000) (a.k.a. Code inconnu) (introduced in Episode 5) dir. Michael HanekeFunny Games (1997) dir. Michael HanekePersona (1966) (introduced in Episode 7) dir. Ingmar Bergman

Episode 14 - New American Independents & The Digital Revolution

The 1990s: The First Days of Digital - Reality Losing Its Realness in America and Australia.Gladiator	(2000)	dir. Ridley ScottIntolerance (1916) (introduced in Episode 1)  dir. D. W. GriffithTerminator 2: Judgment Day	(1991)	dir. James CameronAnchors Aweigh	(1945)	dir. George SidneyGertie the Dinosaur	(1914) (introduced in Episode 4) dir. Winsor McCayJurassic Park	(1993) (introduced in Episode 11) dir. Steven SpielbergTitanic	 (1997) (introduced in Episode 5) dir. James CameronToy Story	(1995)	dir. John LasseterThe Blair Witch Project	(1999)	dir. Daniel Myrick and Eduardo SánchezHouse of Flying Daggers	(2004) (introduced in Episode 12) dir. Zhang YimouGoodfellas	(1990)	dir. Martin ScorseseThe Great Train Robbery	(1903) dir. Edwin S. PorterThe Killers (1946) dir. Robert SiodmakPulp Fiction	(1994)	dir. Quentin TarantinoReservoir Dogs	(1992)	dir. Quentin TarantinoCity on Fire	(1987) dir. Ringo LamBande à Part	(1964) dir. Jean-Luc GodardNatural Born Killers	(1994)	dir. Oliver StoneMiller's Crossing	(1990)	dir. Joel Coen and Ethan CoenThe Hudsucker Proxy	(1994)	dir. Joel Coen and Ethan CoenO Brother, Where Art Thou?	(2000)	dir. Joel Coen and Ethan CoenThe Big Lebowski	(1998)	dir. Joel Coen and Ethan CoenMy Own Private Idaho	(1991)	dir. Gus Van SantThe Shining	(1980)	dir. Stanley KubrickElephant	(2003)	dir. Gus Van SantElephant	(1989)	dir. Alan ClarkeGerry	(2002)	dir. Gus Van SantSátántangó	(1994) (introduced in Episode 5) dir. Béla TarrJeanne Dielman, 23 quai du Commerce, 1080 Bruxelles	(1975)	dir. Chantal AkermanLast Days	(2005)	dir. Gus Van SantPsycho	(1960) (introduced in Episode 8) dir. Alfred HitchcockPsycho	(1998)	dir. Gus Van SantCremaster 3	(2002) dir. Matthew BarneySafety Last!	(1923) (introduced in Episode 2) dir. Fred C. Newmeyer and Sam TaylorRoboCop	(1987) dir. Paul VerhoevenStarship Troopers (1997) dir. Paul VerhoevenAn Angel at My Table	(1990) dir. Jane CampionThe Piano	(1993) dir. Jane CampionRomeo + Juliet	(1996) dir. Baz LuhrmannMoulin Rouge!	(2001) dir. Baz Luhrmann

Episode 15 - Cinema Today and the Future

2000 Onwards: Film Moves Full Circle - and the Future of Movies.Swiss Miss (1938) dir. John G. Blystone and Hal RoachBlonde Venus (1932) dir. Josef von SternbergEmployees Leaving the Lumiere Factory (1895) (introduced in Episode 1) dir. Louis LumièreFahrenheit 9/11 (2004) dir. Michael MooreThe Bourne Supremacy (2004) dir. Paul GreengrassÊtre et avoir (2002) dir. Nicolas PhilibertZidane - A Portrait in the 21st Century (2006) dir. Douglas Gordon and Philippe ParrenoThe Assassination of Jesse James by the Coward Robert Ford (2007) dir. Andrew DominikWay Down East (1920) (introduced in Episode 1) dir. D. W. GriffithClimates (2006) dir. Nuri Bilge CeylanThe Death of Mr. Lazarescu (2005) dir. Cristi PuiuThe Headless Woman (2008) dir. Lucrecia MartelBattle in Heaven (2005) dir. Carlos ReygadasOasis (2002) dir. Lee Chang-DongMemories of Murder (2003) dir. Bong Joon-hoOldboy (2003) dir. Park Chan-wookLe Voyage dans la lune (1902) (introduced in Episode 1) dir. Georges Méliès (Although Mark Cousins and the title on the screen indicate that the scene being shown is from La lune à un mètre, the scene is actually from Le Voyage dans la lune.Mulholland Dr. (2001) dir. David LynchRequiem for a Dream (2000) dir. Darren AronofskySongs from the Second Floor (2000) dir. Roy AnderssonWay Out West (1937) dir. James W. HorneIndiscreet (1958) (introduced in Episode 5) dir. Stanley DonenRules of Attraction (2002) dir. Roger AvaryAvatar (2009) dir. James CameronMotion Capture Mirrors Emotion (2009) dir. Jorge RibasTropical Malady (2004) dir. Apichatpong WeerasethakulMother and Son (1997) dir. Alexander SokurovRussian Ark (2002) dir. Alexander SokurovIn One Breath: Alexander Sokurov's Russian Ark (2003) dir. Knut Elstermann

Epilogue the Year 2046		Inception (2010) (introduced in Episode 4) dir. Christopher NolanEternal Sunshine of the Spotless Mind (2004) dir. Michel Gondry

Critical reception
The film has earned critical praise and holds an 86% fresh rating on review aggregator Rotten Tomatoes, based on six reviews. Shawn Levy, writing for The Oregonian, compared it to "a tour through a museum with a deeply passionate and engaging guide." Mark Feeny, in The Boston Globe, described it as "wildly ambitious, often extremely good, occasionally maddening, and always stimulating."

Criticism
Some critics took issue with Cousins' speaking style, and with portions of his analysis. Village Voice critic Nick Pinkerton argued Cousins took an inconsistent and iconoclastic stance against Hollywood in favour of realist or innovative cinema, stating "for all its claims of rewriting, [The Story of Film] is too reliant on received film buff wisdom".  Writing for Film Comment, Jonathan Rosenbaum was specifically critical of Cousins' view of experimental film, stating "Cousins has a weakness for overwrought yard sales, as his unswerving devotion to Baz Luhrmann, Christopher Nolan, and Lars von Trier repeatedly demonstrates — as well as an obvious lack of ease and fluency when it comes to experimental filmmaking in general, a discomfort that someone like (Matthew) Barney banks on by providing a “digestible” mainstream alternative, rather as Nolan’s Memento provides an unthreatening crossword-puzzle version of the early features of Alain Resnais."

Accolades
 2013 Peabody Award
 Runner-up for Best Documentary Feature-2012 Palm Springs International Film Festival
 Stanley Kubrick Award-2012 Traverse City Film Festival

2021 follow-up 
A 2-hour-and-20-minute follow-up covering films from 2010 to 2021, titled The Story of Film: A New Generation, premiered at the Cannes Film Festival in July 2021.Mark Cousins' 'The Story Of Film: A New Generation' sells to North America (exclusive)|News|Screen Daily It was released in UK cinemas and on streaming platforms in December 2021.

Part 1 - Extending the Language of FilmJoker (2019) dir. Todd PhillipsFrozen (2013) dir. Chris Buck and Jennifer LeeFlame (2018) dir. Sami van IngenCemetery of Splendour (2015) dir. Apichatpong WeerasethakulVarda by Agnès (2019) dir. Agnès VardaPortrait d'une paresseuse (1986) dir. Chantal AkermanLeviathan (2012) dir. Lucien Castaing-Taylor and Véréna ParavelUnder the Skin (2013) dir. Jonathan GlazerBlack Panther (2018) dir. Ryan CooglerUs (2019) dir. Jordan PeeleBooksmart (2019) dir. Olivia WildeGangs of Wasseypur – Part 1 (2012) dir. Anurag KashyapGangs of Wasseypur – Part 2 (2012) dir. Anurag KashyapLemonade (2016) dir. Beyoncé, Kahlil Joseph, Dikayl Rimmasch, Todd Tourso, Jonas Åkerlund, Melina Matsoukas and Mark RomanekHustlers (2019) dir. Lorene ScafariaMidsommar (2019) dir. Ari AsterAn Elephant Sitting Still (2018) dir. Hu BoReason (2018) dir. Anand PatwardhanOn Body and Soul (2017) dir. Ildikó EnyediPK (2014) dir. Rajkumar HiraniGrease (1978) dir. Randal KleiserDeadpool (2016) dir. Tim MillerCrazy World (2014) dir. Nabwana I.G.G.P'tit Quinquin (2014) dir. Bruno DumontVengeance (2009) dir. Johnnie ToZama (2017) dir. Lucrecia MartelGood Time (2017) dir. Josh Safdie and Benny SafdieMad Max: Fury Road (2015) dir. George MillerThe General (1926) dir. Clyde Bruckman and Buster KeatonBaby Driver (2017) dir. Edgar WrightLove Me Tonight (1932) dir. Rouben MamoulianLovers Rock (2019) dir. Steve McQueenGoliyon Ki Raasleela Ram-Leela (2013) dir. Sanjay Leela BhansaliThe French Line (1953) dir. Lloyd BaconMoonlight (2016) dir. Barry JenkinsThree Times (2005) dir. Hou Hsiao-hsienXXY (2007) dir. Lucia PuenzoEvolution (2015) dir. Lucile HadžihalilovićHigh Life (2018) dir. Claire DenisI Am Not a Witch (2017) dir. Rungano NyoniGravity (2013) dir. Alfonso CuarónLa fórmula secreta (1965) dir. Rubén GámezI Lost My Body (2019) dir. Jérémy ClapinSuspiria (2018) dir. Luca GuadagninoThe Babadook (2018) dir. Jennifer KentNovember (2017) dir. Rainer SarnetIt Follows (2014) dir. David Robert MitchellLa Région Centrale (1971) dir. Michael SnowLimite (1931) dir. Mário PeixotoColossal Youth (2006) dir. Pedro CostaCertain Woman (2016) dir. Kelly ReichardtNorte, the End of History (2013) dir. Lav DiazSomething Better to Come (2014) dir. Hanna PolakFor Sama (2019) dir. Waad Al-Kateab and Edward WattsThe Battle of Chile - Part I, II, III (1975, 1976, 1979) dir. Patricio GuzmánThe Pearl Button (2015) dir. Patricio Guzmán2001: A Space Odyssey (1968) dir. Stanley KubrickThe Seashell and the Clergyman (1928) dir. Germaine DulacAttenberg (2010) dir. Athina Rachel TsangariHard to Be a God (2013) dir. Aleksei GermanChimes at Midnight (1966) dir. Orson Welles

Part 2 - What are we Digging for?The Souvenir (2019) dir. Joanna HoggAbou Leila (2019) dir. Amin Sidi-BoumédièneHoly Motors (2012) dir. Leos CaraxBlood of a Poet (1932) dir. Jean CocteauTen (2002) dir. Abbas KiarostamiHappy End (2017) dir. Michael HanekeTangerine (2015) dir. Sean BakerGoodbye to Language (2014) dir. Jean-Luc GoddardHeart of a Dog (2015) dir. Laurie AndersonBlack Mirror: Bandersnatch (2018) dir. David SladeStray Dogs (2013) dir. Tsai Ming-liangI Don't Want to Sleep Alone (2006) dir. Tsai Ming-liangThe Deserted (2017) dir. Tsai Ming-liangThe Arrival of a Train at La Ciotat (1897) dir. Auguste Lumière and Louis LumièreCameraperson (2016) dir. Kirsten JohnsonThe Look of Silence (2014) dir. Joshua OppenheimerThe Act of Killing (2012) dir. Joshua Oppenheimer, Christine Cynn and AnonymousPropaganda (2012) dir. Slavko MartinovRaza (1942) dir. José Luis Sáenz de HerediaSnow White and the Seven Dwarfs (1937) dir. David HandWar for the Planet of the Apes (2017) dir. Matt ReevesDevi (1960) dir. Satyajit RayA Real Young Girl (1976) dir. Catherine BreillatGet Out (2017) dir. Jordan PeeleThe Passion of Joan of Arc (1928) dir. Carl Theodor DreyerLa Pointe Courte (1955) dir. Agnès VardaThe Irishman (2019) dir. Martin ScorseseAu Hasard Balthazar (2019) dir. Robert BressonDAU. Degeneration (2020) dir. Ilya Khrzhanovsky and Ilya PermyakovFrank (2014) dir. Lenny AbrahamsonSon of Saul (2015) dir. László NemesI Do Not Care If We Go Down in History as Barbarians (2018) dir. Radu JudeParasite (2019) dir. Bong Joon HoTlamess (2019) dir. Ala Eddine SlimAtlantics (2019) dir. Mati DiopSong of the Sea (2014) dir. Tomm MooreBorder (2018) dir. Ali AbbasiFreaks (1932) dir. Tod BrowningThe Farewell (2019) dir. Lulu WangQuo Vadis, Aida? (2020) dir. Jasmila ŽbanićShoplifters (2018) dir. Hirokazu Kore-edaEarly Summer (1951) dir. Yasujirō OzuWhite Mama (2018) dir. Evgeniya Ostanina and Zosya RodkevichLeave No Trace (2018) dir. Debra GranikHappy as Lazzaro (2018) dir. Alice RohrwacherTheorem (1968) dir. Pier Paolo PasoliniA Fantastic Woman (2017) dir. Sebastián Lelio13th (2016) dir. Ava DuVernayShip of Theseus (2012) dir. Anand GandhiPortrait of a Lady on Fire (2019) dir. Céline SciammaCold War (2018) dir. Paweł PawlikowskiSpider-Man: Into the Spider-verse'' (2018) dir. Peter Ramsey

References

External links

The Story of Film: An Odyssey at Channel 4
The Story of Film: An Odyssey on Letterboxd

British documentary television series
Channel 4 original programming
Documentary films about the film industry
Peabody Award-winning television programs
Films directed by Mark Cousins
2011 television films
2011 films
Essays about film
2010s British films